Federal Route 175 (formerly Kedah state route K8, K11, K13 and K10) is a federal road in Kedah, Malaysia. The Kilometre Zero of the Federal Route 175 starts at Kepala Batas near Sultan Abdul Halim Airport.

Features
At most sections, the Federal Route 175 was built under the JKR R5 road standard, with a speed limit of 90 km/h.

List of junctions and towns

References

Malaysian Federal Roads